Ceratopogonidae is a family of flies commonly known as no-see-ums, or biting midges, generally  in length. The family includes more than 5,000 species,  distributed worldwide, apart from the Antarctic and the Arctic.

Ceratopogonidae are holometabolous, meaning their development includes four life stages: egg, larva, pupa, and imago or adult.  Most common species in warmer climates will take about two to six weeks to complete a life cycle. Both adult males and females feed on nectar. Most females also feed on the blood of vertebrates, including humans, to get protein for egg-laying. Their bites are painful, and can cause intensely itchy lesions. Their mouthparts are well-developed for cutting the skin of their hosts. Some species prey on other insects.

Larvae need moisture to develop, but also air and food. They are not strictly aquatic or terrestrial.

Some species within the biting midges are thought to be predatory on other small insects. Particularly mosquito larvae have been investigated as common prey for biting midges in the genus  Bezzia. For example, experiments have been conducted on the species Bezzia nobilis that suggest their reliance on mosquito larvae as one source of prey. They can also be hematophagous parasites of invertebrates, depending on whether the bloodsucking attack is fatal.

Like other blood sucking flies, Culicoides species can be vectors of disease-causing pathogens. Among diseases transmitted are the parasitic nematodes Mansonella, bluetongue disease, African horse sickness, epizootic hemorrhagic disease, arboviruses, and nonviral animal pathogens.

Historically, numbers were managed with the insecticide DDT as with Leptoconops torrens populations in California. They can be trapped by luring them with carbon dioxide. Most midges are small enough to pass through ordinary insect window screening. They can be repelled with DEET, oil of Eucalyptus, or Icaridin. Their larvae have also been shown to be susceptible to treatment with commercially available preparations of Bacillus thuringiensis israelensis.

Subfamilies
The Leptoconopinae is a subfamily of biting midges. The larvae are recognized by their unique sclerites of the head, and by their mouthparts.

The Forcipomyiinae are a subfamily of biting midges. In this subfamily, both anterior and posterior prolegs are present on the larvae. Larvae are both terrestrial and aquatic, and feed primarily on algae and fungi.  Some species are important pollinators of tropical crops such as the cocoa bean.

Larvae of species in the Dasyheleinae subfamily are characterized by an anal segment with retractile posterior prolegs. Larvae are aquatic and adults do not feed on vertebrate blood, nor do they prey on other insects. They take nectar only, an unusual feeding behavior within the Ceratopogonidae.

The Ceratopogoninae subfamily has elongated larvae without prolegs or hooks. Most larvae of this subfamily are predatory. Adults generally take vertebrate blood or attack other insects. Most females in the subfamily Ceratopogoninae feed on insects similar to them in size.

The oldest known member of the family is Archiaustroconops besti from the Purbeck Group of Dorset, England dating to the Berriasian, around 142 million years ago.

Systematics 
Basal lineages

 †Lebanoculicoides Szadziewski 1996 Lebanese amber, Barremian, Spanish amber, Albian
 Subfamily Leptoconopinae Noe 1907
 †Archiaustroconops Szadziewski 1996 Durlston Formation, United Kingdom, Berriasian, Lebanese amber, Barremian, Jordanian amber, Spanish amber, Albian, Burmese amber, Myanmar, Cenomanian
 Austroconops Wirth and Lee 1958 Barremian-Present
 †Fossileptoconops Szadziewski 1996 Lebanese amber, Barremian
 †Jordanoconops Szadziewski 2000 Jordanian amber, Albian
 Leptoconops Skuse 1889 Barremian-Present
 †Minyohelea Borkent 1995 Austrian amber, Hauterivian Lebanese amber, Barremian, Canadian amber, Campanian
 †Archiculicoides Szadziewski 1996 Lebanese amber, Barremian
 †Gerontodacus Borkent 2019 Lebanese amber, Barremian, Spanish amber, Albian
 †Protoculicoides Boesel 1937 Burmese amber, Myanmar, Cenomanian, Canadian amber, Campanian
 †Atriculicoides Remm 1976 Spanish amber, Albian Durtal amber, France, Cenomanian, Burmese amber, Myanmar, Cenomanian, Taimyr amber, Russia, Cenomanian, Santonian
Dasyhelea Kieffer 1913
Subfamily Forcipomyiinae
Atrichopogon Kieffer 1906
Forcipomyia Meigen, 1818
†Adelohelea Borkent 1995 Hungarian amber, Santonian, Canadian amber, Campanian
†Heleageron Borkent 1995 New Jersey amber, Turonian Canadian amber, Campanian
†Alautunmyia Borkent 1996 New Jersey amber, Turonian

Gallery

References

 
Nematocera families
Taxa named by Edward Newman
Articles containing video clips